William Lincoln Giles (July 5, 1911 – May 13, 1997) was president of Mississippi State University from 1966–1976.

Giles was born in Oklahoma and grew up in Little Rock, Arkansas. He earned bachelor's and master's degrees at the University of Arkansas and a Ph.D. in botany at the University of Missouri.

Early life and career
Giles served in the army during World War II, and worked at the Soil Conservation Service in Kansas and the Agricultural research Center in Maryland before coming to Mississippi State University in 1949.  At that time is served as the University's Seed Technology Laboratory manager, a position he kept for three years before moving to the Delta Branch Experiment Station in Stoneville, MS.  He was appointed the Vice President for Agriculture and Forestry at MSU in 1961.

In the 1960s, Giles garnered numerous awards and accolades.  These included being names the "Man of the Year in Agriculture" by Progressive Farmer in 1960 and the "Conservationist of the Year" by the American Society of Soil Conservation in 1963.

In 1966, he was elected the 13th president of Mississippi State University.  During his tenure, he was responsible for a large building program that included the addition of a new student union, chapel (built from the remains of Old Main), student health center and over 35 academic buildings that were either constructed, enlarged or renovated.  Enrollment also increased from 8,000 to 12,000 students.

Later life
Bill Giles retired in 1976 to his farm near Starkville, MS.  He was married to Jean Presson Giles. They had one daughter, Ginger, and two sons, Richard and John.  Giles died on May 13, 1997 at the age of 85.

Honors
The William L. Giles Distinguished Professor Award at Mississippi is named in his honor.
Giles Hall which houses the Mississippi State University College of Architecture, Art, and Design is named in his honor.

References

External links
Mississippi State University General Information
Gallery of the Presidents
W.L Giles Distinguished Professors

Presidents of Mississippi State University
1911 births
1997 deaths
University of Missouri alumni
University of Arkansas alumni
Mississippi State University alumni
United States Army personnel of World War II
20th-century American academics